Benn F. Reyes (born San Francisco 1915 - died Stockholm Sweden 1968) was an American publicist and impresario mainly known for his work in movies. Reyes' best-known ventures in this field were his collaborations with American director Stanley Kubrick, including the films Lolita Dr. Strangelove and 2001: A Space Odyssey.

Biography
Reyes was born in San Francisco in 1915 and began his career there as a newspaper reporter and feature writer, working for the Scripps Howard Syndicate and Pacific International Features. He started working in the film promotion in the late 1930s in San Francisco working with Warner Brothers, RKO and the Selznick Releasing Organization. During World War II, he served as a combat photographer in the U.S. Air Force with the rank of first lieutenant and was in the advance wave of military personnel to land in Japan.

In 1938 Reyes gained notoriety in an obscenity case involving noted burlesque dancer Sally Rand when he convinced a San Francisco judge to view her fan dance at the local Savoy theatre to determine if her act was obscene. The judge cleared her of all charges and Rand was allowed to keep the dance in her repertoire. In 1945 Reyes discovered a dirt track racing drive called Earl Muntz. and convinced him to move into the sale of used cars This began a 10-year relationship during which time Muntz became internationally famous as Madman Muntz, who also became a pioneer in the sale of car stereos and other electronic equipment.

Reyes was later associated with Valient Films and Video Artists. During the 1950s he worked extensively with his old friend and business colleague, promoter Lee Gordon. In partnership with Gordon and Detroit promoter Arthur Shergin the trio formed a syndicate to import top-line jazz, rock'n'roll and comedy performers to Australia under the aegis of Gorodn's Australian promotions company, Big Show Pty Ltd. The Big Show tours revolutionised the Australian entertainment scene and between 1954 and 1962 they brought some 472 leading American acts to Australia including Ella Fitzgerald, Louis Armstrong, Buddy Holly, Bob Hope, Little Richard and The Everly Brothers. Many Big Show tours were hugely successful but others were expensive failures and in later years the company's fortunes were hampered by Gordon's increasingly erratic personal behaviour. The company was eventually wound up in the early 1960s after Gordon was arrested in Sydney on drug charges - he fled the country before he faced trial and died in London in November 1963 aged 40.

In 1963 Reyes founded and operated Centre International De L'Industrie Du Cinema (CIIC), in Brussels, Belgium, which was a major international exchange for producers. He resigned from CIIC in 1967 to work on 2001: A Space Odyssey.

Reyes reportedly died of a heart attack in Stockholm, Sweden in 1968, aged 53.

References

Benn F Reyes obituary, Valley News, Van Nuys, California,15 December 1968, p. 38 (accessed 2017-05-26)

1915 births
1968 deaths
People from San Francisco